Luiz Carlos Oliveira de Bitencourt (born May 24, 1988 in Porto Alegre), is a Brazilian goalkeeper who is currently playing for Sport in the Campeonato Brasileiro Série A.

References

1988 births
Footballers from Porto Alegre
Living people
Brazilian footballers
Brazilian expatriate footballers
Expatriate footballers in Portugal
Association football goalkeepers
Primeira Liga players
Campeonato Brasileiro Série A players
Campeonato Brasileiro Série C players
Sport Club Internacional players
Grêmio Esportivo Brasil players
Esporte Clube São José players
Esporte Clube Juventude players
Sport Club do Recife players
Clube Náutico Capibaribe players